The Big Three were a Merseybeat group from Liverpool. They are best known for their 1963 recording of "Some Other Guy" and their close connection to the Beatles.

Career
The Big Three evolved from a group called Cass and the Cassanovas, formed in May 1959 by Brian Casser as a trio comprising Casser (rhythm guitar, lead vocals), Adrian Barber (lead guitar, vocals), and Brian J. Hudson (drums) (born Brian James Hudson, 21 April 1938, Cleveland, North Yorkshire). The original line-up played at St George's Hall, Liverpool, on Friday, 15 May 1959. Johnny Hutchinson (born 18 July 1940) replaced Hudson in July 1959. In need of a bass guitarist, Hutchinson brought in Johnny Gustafson in December. At that time, Gustafson did not have a proper bass guitar, so Barber converted an acoustic for him. Gustafson's first gig was at The Tower Ballroom, New Brighton, on 31 December 1959.

In May 1960, the band auditioned for Larry Parnes at the Wyvern Social Club, Seel Street, Liverpool, with a number of other bands including The Silver Beetles. Hutchinson sat in with the band when their drummer Tommy Moore (born Thomas Henry Moore, in 1931, Liverpool died in 1981) failed to turn up. In December 1960, Casser left the group and moved to London, reducing them to a trio again, and the band re-emerged in January 1961 as The Big Three. Despite being a three-piece they were known as "one of the loudest, most aggressive and visually appealing acts".

Brian Epstein signed them to his agency and sent them over to Hamburg's Star-Club. It was during that trip in July 1962 that Brian Griffiths (born 27 August 1943, Liverpool) joined the group, and the best-known line-up of the Big Three was established.  Barber would subsequently emigrate to the United States, where he would later become known as an in-house recording engineer and producer at Atlantic Records, where he produced the Allman Brothers Band's debut album in 1969.

Epstein arranged for them to audition for Decca Records, for which audition they recorded "Some Other Guy". The song was a minor chart hit, and later it became a standard in the Merseybeat scene.

The Big Three and Epstein terminated their partnership in July 1963. Gustafson and Griffiths quit in November 1963, and with drummer Ian Broad from Rory Storm and the Hurricanes formed the Seniors and left for Germany. Hutchinson replaced them with Faron Ruffley (born William Faron Ruffley, 8 January 1942, Walton, Liverpool) and Paddy Chambers (born Patrick John Chambers, 3 April 1944, Liverpool, died 18 September 2000) from Faron's Flamingos.

Chambers left in March 1964 and was replaced by Paul Pilnick from Lee Curtis' Allstars. Pilnick only stayed a short time before moving on to Tony Jackson & The Vibrations in October 1964, with Ruffley leaving around the same time.

Various musicians passed through the band after Pilnick left, including bass players John Bradley, Adrian Lord (ex Mojos), and Mike Bankes, whilst Ray Marshall and Howie Casey played saxophone on a trip to Germany. Barry Womersley was guitarist for a while, but was replaced by Brian Griffiths during the time that they were managed by Chris Wharton. Wharton had hopes of re-enlisting Johnny Gustafson but this came to nothing. Hutchinson had played with the Spidermen, but reformed the group with Barry Womersley and Ray Marshall.

Between 1964 and 1966, the line-up consisted of John Hutchinson, Ray Marshall (vocals, bass) and Barry Womersley (lead guitar). During 1966 the band folded. Hutchinson received an offer to join Kingsize Taylor & the Dominoes but he declined, instead deciding to retire from music.

Arty Davies of 'Liverpool Beat' says that following the demise of the Womersley/Marshall/Hutchinson line-up, a couple of bookings featured the following : Dave Blackstone (lead guitar), Johnny Hutchinson (drums) and Pete Mumford (bass guitar). There is an apocryphal story in Alan Clayson's book Beat Merchants that Hutchinson packed up his drums after a first set at the Blue Angel, collected his pay and went home, with another drummer taking his place. Presumably this was the band's last gig.

In 1973, Gustafson and Griffiths teamed up with Elton John drummer Nigel Olsson, and Quatermass keyboardist J. Peter Robinson for a reunion album, Resurrection, released on Polydor Records. In 1999 Griffiths got together with another former Big Three member, Faron Ruffley, to do a small spot of Big Three numbers at the Merseycats charity night; the drummer for the get-together was Arty Davies (Faron's Flamingos).

In 2009, RPM Records issued a CD compilation entitled Cavern Stomp.

In 2017 Bill Kenwright released and toured the sell-out musical Cilla The Musical; The Big Three (played by Jay Osborne, Chris Weeks and Tom Dunlea) appeared in the show and doubled as the show band. Following the tour the three players were 'handed down the baton' to become the next generation of The Big Three by original members Griffiths, Gustafson, and Hutchinson. The new Big Three are set to write and release brand new material in early 2020.

Johnny Hutchinson died on 12 April 2019. He, Gustafson and Griffiths all appear in the film about the band Some Other Guys.

Members
 Johnny Hutchinson – drums, vocals (1961–1966)
 Adrian Barber – first guitarist, lead guitar, vocals (1961–7/1962)
 Johnny Gustafson – bass guitar, vocals (1961–1963, 1973)
 Brian Griffiths – guitar (7/1962–1963, 1973, 1999)
 Faron Ruffley – bass guitar (1963–1964, 1999)
 Paddy Chambers – guitar, vocals (1963–1964)
 Paul Pilnick – guitar, vocals (1964)
 Ray Marshall – bass guitar, vocals (1964-1966)
 Barry Womersley (known professionally as Barry Walmsley) – lead guitar (1964-1966)
 Nigel Olsson – drums (1973)

Related musicians
 Cilla Black and Beryl Marsden were backed by the Big Three
 J. Peter Robinson – piano (1973 album recordings)
 Arty Davies – drums (1999 one-off gig)

Timeline

Discography

Singles
"Some Other Guy" (Leiber, Stoller, Barrett) / "Let True Love Begin" (Decca F 11614, 29 March 1963, UK No. 37)
"By the Way" / "Cavern Stomp" (Decca F 11689, 28 June 1963, UK No. 22)
"I'm With You" / "Peanut Butter" (Decca F 11752, 11 October 1963)
"If You Ever Change Your Mind" / "You've Got to Keep Her under Your Hand" (Decca F 11927, 12 June 1964)
"Some Other Guy" / "Let It Rock" / "If You Gotta Make a Fool of Somebody" (Polydor 2058 343, 16 March 1973)

EPs
At the Cavern (live) ("What'd I Say" / "Don't Start Running Away" / "Zip A Dee Doo Dah" / "Reelin' and Rockin'") (Decca DFE 8552 [mono], 22 November 1963; reissued 1981)

Albums
 Resurrection (Polydor 2383199, March 1973)

Compilation albums
 Cavern Stomp (LP, Edsel ED 111, 1982)
 Cavern Stomp (CD, Deram, 1994)
 Cavern Stomp (The Complete Recordings) (RPM Records, 2009)

References

External links
Mersey Beat: The Big Three Story by Bill Harry

 

English pop music groups
English rock music groups
British rhythm and blues boom musicians
British rhythm and blues musical groups
Musical groups from Liverpool
Musical groups established in 1961
Musical groups disestablished in 1964
British musical trios
Beat groups
Decca Records artists
Polydor Records artists
1961 establishments in England